Earthworm Jim is a video game franchise based on the adventures of an anthropomorphic earthworm.

Earthworm Jim may also refer to:
Earthworm Jim (video game), a 1994 video game and first in the series.
Earthworm Jim 2
Earthworm Jim 3D
Earthworm Jim: Menace 2 the Galaxy
Earthworm Jim 4
Earthworm Jim HD
Earthworm Jim (cancelled video game), an entry in the series that was planned for PSP
Earthworm Jim (TV series), television series based in the video game series

See also